The Feldkirch Poetry Award, in German Feldkircher Lyrikpreis, started by Erika Kronabitter, an Austrian artist and writer, is granted annually by the Theater am Saumarkt in Feldkirch, Vorarlberg/Austria. Among the sponsors, there are the Austrian government, the local authorities of Vorarlberg as well as private banks. In 2003, the poetry award was granted for the first time.

On an international basis, poets may submit their poems. The jury is composed by German philologists and poets. The awarded poets are presented to the public during Fall. The winning texts will be archived in the Library of Vorarlberg.

Awarded Writers

2022 
 Ann Kathrin Ast
 (tie) Philipp Hauser, Armin Steigenberger
 Publikumspreis Sascha Kokot

2021 
 Sarah Rinderer
 Martin Piekar
 Elke Laznia

2020 
 Tobias Pagel
 Simone Schabert
 Monika Vasik

2019 
 Lars Arvid Brischke
 Joseph Felix Ernst
 Norbert Kröll

2018 
 David Fuchs
 Bastian Schneider
 Manuela Bibrach

2017 
 Thomas Amann
 Johannes Tröndle ex aequo with Bernd Marcel Gonner

2016 
 Arnold Maxwill
 Hartwig Mauritz

2015 
 Susanne Eules
 Christoph Szalay

2014 
 Axel Görlach
 Anja Kampmann
  Ute Dietl

2013 
 Tabea Xenia Magyar und Tristan Marquardt (D)
 Sibylla Vričić Hausmann (D)
 Sandra Hubinger (A)
 Special award: Martin Amanshauser (A)

2012 
 Elisabeth Steinkellner
 Sascha Kokot und Andra Schwarz

2011 
 Tobias Falberg
 C. H. Huber
 Claudia Scherer

2010 
 Kenah Cusanit
 Regina Hilber
 Udo Kawasser

2009 
 Marcus Pöttler
 Silke Peters and Thilo Krause (ex aequo)

2008 
 Andreas Neeser
 Martin Strauß
 Lina Hofstädter

2007
 Klaus Händl
 Bernhard Saupe
 Alexandra Lavizzari
 Thomas Steiner

2006
 Adelheid Dahimène
 Christine Haidegger
 Ludwig Laher
 Hans Eichhorn

2005
 Knut Schaflinger
 Julia Rhomberg
 Udo Kawasser
 Klaus Ebner

2004
 Elsbeth Maag
 Knut Schaflinger
 Lisa Mayer
 Gertrude Pieber-Prem
 Sabine Eschgfäller
 Udo Kawasser und Walter Pucher

2003
 Elfriede Kehrer
 Norbert Mayer
 Walter Pucher
 Mechthild Podzeit-Lütjen
 Ulrike Ulrich

External links
Theater am Saumarkt
Article of the Austrian television on the 5th Poetry Award

Sources
Austrian newspaper Vorarlberger Nachrichten

Poetry awards
Austrian culture
Awards established in 2003
Austrian literary awards